Vajrapu-kotturu is a village in Srikakulam district of the Indian state of Andhra Pradesh. Vajrapukotturu mandal is bordered by Mandasa, Palasa, Nandigam and Santha Bommali mandals of Srikakulam district and has a long coastline off Bay of Bengal. Bendi Gedda river joins the sea after forming a lagoon in this mandal area.

Demographics
 Indian census, the demographic details of Vajrapu Kotturu mandal is as follows:
 Total Population: 	69,398	in 16,224 Households
 Male Population: 	33,380	and Female Population: 	36,018		
 Children Under 6-years of age: 9,077 (Boys -	4,573 and Girls 	4,504)
 Total Literates: 	36,627

References 

Villages in Srikakulam district
Mandal headquarters in Srikakulam district